Beauty is a 2011 South African film co-written and directed by Oliver Hermanus. It premiered in the Un Certain Regard section at the 2011 Cannes Film Festival. The film was selected as the South African entry for the Best Foreign Language Film at the 84th Academy Awards, but it did not make the final shortlist.

Plot
François van Heerden (Deon Lotz), is a white man in his late forties who lives in Bloemfontein in South Africa. Married with two grown daughters, he runs his own timber business and leads a seemingly comfortable life. He is also openly racist and homophobic, but at the same time he is sexually attracted to other men and regularly has secret sexual encounters with other white closeted men.

At his daughter's wedding reception, he meets Christian Roodt (Charlie Keegan), the handsome young son of old family friends who live in Cape Town. Christian is studying law at university while also enjoying a budding side career as a male model. François becomes infatuated with Christian, learning everything he can about him. When François' other daughter Anika later starts dating Christian, François becomes jealous and contrives a way to punish her.

During a visit to his doctor for an examination, it becomes clear that François is suffering from psychological problems that are affecting his health, no doubt partly related to his inability to come to terms with his true sexuality.

After telling his wife he needs to go to Cape Town on business for a few days, François goes to visit the Roodts so that he can be around Christian. When Christian is not there, he asks for Christian's phone number under the pretext of discussing a legal matter with him. Later, after getting drunk in a gay bar in the city, François calls Christian and asks him to come and collect him. Christian obliges and the two have a meal. François is thrilled at the chance of being alone with him, and later invites him back to his hotel room for a drink. Once there, Christian takes the opportunity to ask François if he would invest in his plan to start his own business. Suspecting that Christian may not actually be interested in him but only his money, François clumsily attempts to kiss him but is gently rebuffed. After a few moments, François then unexpectedly erupts into a violent rage and assaults and rapes Christian.

Days later, back at home, François asks Anika if she is still seeing Christian but she says she hasn't heard from him in a while. François quietly continues with his life as usual, almost as if the horrific crime he committed never happened.

Cast
 Deon Lotz as François van Heerden
 Roeline Daneel as Anika van Heerden
 Sue Diepeveen as Marika Roodt
 Charlie Keegan as Christian Roodt
 Albert Maritz as Willem Roodt
 Michelle Scott as Elena van Heerden

Critical reception
The film received positive reviews from critics. The majority of critics praised Deon Lotz's performance, Peter Bradshaw from ''The Guardian called it "A ferociously powerful, yet subtle and complex performance" and said it gave the film "a tragic dimension". David Parkinson from Empire Magazine also praised Lotz, and in his three out of five stars review summarized his verdict as "Despite that title, there's an ugly power to this study of obsession and anger."

Awards
Beauty was awarded the Queer Palm Award at the 2011 Cannes Film Festival. Actor Deon Lotz received a special mention in the 2011 Zurich Film Festival for his performance in the film.

See also
 List of submissions to the 84th Academy Awards for Best Foreign Language Film
 List of South African submissions for the Academy Award for Best Foreign Language Film

References

External links
 
 

2011 drama films
2011 films
2011 LGBT-related films
Afrikaans-language films
Films set in South Africa
Films about anti-LGBT sentiment
Films directed by Oliver Hermanus
Gay-related films
Homophobia in fiction
LGBT-related drama films
Queer Palm winners
South African LGBT-related films
South African drama films